The Carolinas International Tennis Tournament, also known by its sponsored name North Carolina National Bank Tennis Classic, was a men's tennis tournament played at the Julian J. Clark Tennis Stadium on the grounds of the Olde Providence Racquet Club in Charlotte, North Carolina from 1971 through 1977.  The inaugural edition was part of the Grand Prix tennis circuit while the following editions were part of the World Championship Tennis (WCT) circuit. The event was held on outdoor hard courts in 1971, and on outdoor clay courts from 1972 through 1977.

Past finals

Singles

Doubles

References
Association of Tennis Professionals (ATP) – Tournament archive

World Championship Tennis
Defunct tennis tournaments in the United States
Sports competitions in Charlotte, North Carolina
Recurring sporting events established in 1971
1977 disestablishments in North Carolina
1971 establishments in North Carolina